"Hurts So Bad" is the third single released by Australian Idol series two runner-up Anthony Callea. The song appears on his self-titled debut album, Anthony Callea (2005). It was his third consecutive top-10 single in Australia but was his first not to reach number one.

Track listing
The single had four versions of "Hurts So Bad" and came with a bonus sticker.
 "Hurts So Bad" (album version)
 "Hurts So Bad" (Low Frequency Occupation Crazy Fader Remix)
 "Hurts So Bad" (M.N. Re-Work)
 "Hurts So Bad" (Low Frequency Occupation Summer Funk Club Mix)

Music video
The music video feature Callea with a mystery woman, it was filmed in Cuba, there is a scene where Callea performed in front of Che Guevara portrait.

Charts

References

2005 singles
2005 songs
Anthony Callea songs
Songs written by Eric Sanicola
Sony BMG singles